Kenneth Brian Bowman  (born December 15, 1942) is an American former professional football player. He played center in the National Football League for ten seasons, all with the Green Bay Packers. In his fourth NFL season in 1967, Bowman was the center during the winning play of the Ice Bowl in which Bart Starr scored the winning touchdown on a quarterback sneak in the final seconds for a third consecutive NFL title.

Born and raised in Illinois, Bowman played college football at the University of Wisconsin in Madison.  During his junior year in 1962, the Badgers were Big Ten Conference champions and played USC in the  Bowman was selected by the Packers in the eighth round of the 1964 NFL Draft and succeeded hall of famer Jim Ringo at center for the Packers as a rookie in 1964.

Bowman ended his 11-year professional career in 1975 in Honolulu with The Hawaiians of the struggling World Football League, which folded on

After football
Bowman returned to Wisconsin in 1975 and practiced law. He and his wife moved to Arizona in 1994 and in semi-retirement he served as a special magistrate for the City of Tucson, Town of Oro Valley, and Town of Marana. He also serves on the Board of Regents of Concordia University Wisconsin.

References

External links

1942 births
Living people
People from Milan, Illinois
Players of American football from Illinois
American football offensive linemen
Wisconsin Badgers football players
Green Bay Packers players